The Tennessee Sports Hall of Fame is an American hall of fame which honors athletes, teams, coaches, sports writers, and sports executives for their contributions to sports in the state of Tennessee. The Hall of Fame inducted its first class in 1966 and has since grown to include over 500 honorees and inductees.

History
The Tennessee Sports Hall of Fame was founded in 1966 by the Middle Tennessee Sportswriters and Broadcasters Association, although it is now managed by the State of Tennessee. It was originally located in Knoxville, Tennessee, on the University of Tennessee campus but later moved to the state's capital in Nashville. It is located in Bridgestone Arena in downtown Nashville. In 2016, David Blackburn was elected its president.

References

External links
 Tennessee Sports Hall of Fame

All-sports halls of fame
State sports halls of fame in the United States
Halls of fame in Tennessee
Sports in Tennessee
Sports in Nashville, Tennessee
Tourist attractions in Nashville, Tennessee
Awards established in 1966
1966 establishments in Tennessee
Sports museums in Tennessee